Rasa Bugavičute-Pēce (born 25 January 1988 in Riga, Latvia) is a Latvian playwright and author.

Life and career 
Bugavičute-Pēce received her primary schooling at the Riga French Lyceum before going on to study at the Latvian Academy of Culture, graduating in 2011 with a bachelor's degree in Theatre, Film and TV Drama. In 2013 she received a magister degree in Culture Management, also from the Academy of Culture. The same year she received a second magister degree, in Writing Studies, from the University of Liepāja.

In 2011, Bugavičute-Pēce was elected chair of the Latvian Playwrights' Guild, serving until 2015. Since 2015 she has been a playwright at the Liepāja Theatre. Her works have also been performed at multiple other theatres, including the Latvian National Theatre, the Dailes Theatre, and the Dirty Deal Teatro.

Bugavičute-Pēce is the author of two novels: Mans vārds ir Klimpa, un man patīk viss (My Name is Klimpa and I Like Everything) from 2016, and Puika, kurš redzēja tumsā (The Boy Who Saw in the Dark). The song Lec, saulīte!, with lyrics by Bugavičute-Pēce and accompanying music by Raimonds Tiguls, was performed at the closing concert of the 2018 Latvian Song and Dance Festival.

Personal life 
Bugavičute-Pēce is married to Sandis Pēcis, an actor at the Liepāja Theatre. They have two children.

References

External links 
Official website

1988 births
Living people
University of Liepāja alumni
21st-century Latvian writers
21st-century Latvian women writers
21st-century novelists
Latvian women novelists
Latvian Academy of Culture alumni